Camelobaetidius is a genus of small minnow mayflies in the family Baetidae. There are at least 40 described species in Camelobaetidius.

Species
These 44 species belong to the genus Camelobaetidius:

 Camelobaetidius alcyoneus (Traver, 1943) c g
 Camelobaetidius anubis (Traver & Edmunds, 1968) c g
 Camelobaetidius arriaga (Traver and Edmunds, 1968) i c g
 Camelobaetidius baumgardneri g
 Camelobaetidius billi Thomas & Dominique, 2000 c g
 Camelobaetidius carolinae g
 Camelobaetidius cayumba (Traver & Edmunds, 1968) c g
 Camelobaetidius cruzi g
 Camelobaetidius dryops (Needham & Murphy, 1924) c g
 Camelobaetidius edmundsi Dominique, Thomas & Mathuriau, 2001 c g
 Camelobaetidius francischettii Salles, Andrade & Da-Silva, 2005 c g
 Camelobaetidius hamadae Salles & Serrao, 2005 c g
 Camelobaetidius huarpe Nieto, 2003 c g
 Camelobaetidius ipaye Nieto, 2004 c g
 Camelobaetidius janae Thomas & Dominique, 2000 c g
 Camelobaetidius juparana Boldrini & Salles, 2012 c g
 Camelobaetidius kickapoo McCafferty in McCafferty and Randolph, 2000 i c g
 Camelobaetidius kondratieffi Lugo-Ortiz and McCafferty, 1995 i c g
 Camelobaetidius lassance Salles & Serrao, 2005 c g
 Camelobaetidius leentvaari Demoulin, 1966 c g
 Camelobaetidius maidu Jacobus and McCafferty, 2005 i c g
 Camelobaetidius mantis Traver & Edmunds, 1968 c g
 Camelobaetidius maranhensis Salles & Serrao, 2005 c g
 Camelobaetidius mathuriae Dominique & Thomas, 2001 c g
 Camelobaetidius matilei Thomas, Peru & Horeau, 2001 c g
 Camelobaetidius mexicanus (Traver and Edmunds, 1968) i c g
 Camelobaetidius musseri (Traver and Edmunds, 1968) i c g
 Camelobaetidius ortizi Dominique & Thomas, 2001 c g
 Camelobaetidius patricki Dominique & Thomas, 2001 c g
 Camelobaetidius penai (Traver & Edmunds, 1968) c g
 Camelobaetidius phaedrus (Traver & Edmunds, 1968) c g
 Camelobaetidius rufiventris Boldrini & Salles, 2009 c g
 Camelobaetidius sallesi g
 Camelobaetidius serapis (Traver & Edmunds, 1968) c g
 Camelobaetidius shepardi Randolph and McCafferty, 2001 i c g
 Camelobaetidius spinosus Boldrini & Salles, 2012 c g
 Camelobaetidius suapi Nieto, 2002 c g
 Camelobaetidius tantillus (Needham & Murphy, 1924) c g
 Camelobaetidius tepequensis g
 Camelobaetidius tuberosus Lugo-Ortiz & McCafferty, 1999 c g
 Camelobaetidius variabilis Wiersema, 1998 i c g
 Camelobaetidius waltzi McCafferty, 1994 i c g
 Camelobaetidius warreni (Traver & Edmunds, 1968) i c g b
 Camelobaetidius yacutinga Nieto, 2003 c g

Data sources: i = ITIS, c = Catalogue of Life, g = GBIF, b = Bugguide.net

References

Further reading

 
 
 
 
 
 
 

Mayflies
Mayfly genera